Mount Paget is a summit of Allardyce Range on the South Atlantic/Antarctic island of South Georgia. It is the highest peak on the island, and also the highest peak in any territory under the sovereignty of the United Kingdom (excluding the British Antarctic Territory, which has no permanent population and where British sovereignty is unrecognized by most countries, where Mount Hope is the highest peak), more than twice the height of Ben Nevis, the highest mountain on the island of Great Britain.

It is a saddle-shaped mountain, marking the highest point of the Allardyce Range in the central part of South Georgia. This feature was known to early sealers and whalers at South Georgia, and the name has long been established through general usage. It is clearly visible from Grytviken and King Edward Point.

See also
Sutton Crag

References
 Stonehouse, B (ed.) Encyclopedia of Antarctica and the Southern Oceans (2002)

Paget, Mount